The .17 Remington Fireball was created in 2007 by Remington Arms Company as a response to the popular wildcat round, the .17 Mach IV. Factory loads drive a 20 grain (1.3 g) bullet around 4,000 ft/s (1,219 m/s). Velocity is close to the .17 Remington but with significantly less powder, and therefore less heat and fouling. Both are important issues to high-volume shooters such as varmint hunters.

Overview
It is based on the .221 Remington Fireball necked down to accept a .17 caliber bullet and is very similar to the .17 Mach IV. Reports on this cartridge show mild recoil, high velocity, with minimal report (noise).

Dimensions

Gallery

See also
 4 mm caliber
 .17 Hornet
 .17 Ackley Bee
 List of rifle cartridges
 Table of handgun and rifle cartridges

References

 Remington .17 Remington Fireball page

External links

 17 Remington Fireball
 Straight Dope: The .17s
 Remington .17 Fireball
 Remington SPS Varmint / 17 Rem Fireball
 The Wonderful World of 17 Caliber Centerfires
 Remington Unveils the .17 Remington Fireball Bilstering Speed, Superior Accuracy and Explosive Impact
 
 

Pistol and rifle cartridges
Remington Arms cartridges